Masaharu Ueda (Japanese: 上田正治) (born January 1, 1938) is a Japanese cinematographer. He worked several times with filmmaker Akira Kurosawa. He was nominated for the Academy Award for Best Cinematography for his work in the film Ran (1985).

External links

Japanese cinematographers
1938 births
Living people